USS Gamble (DD–123/DM-15) was a  in the United States Navy during World War I, later converted to a minelayer in World War II.

Namesakes
Peter Gamble was born on 5 November 1793 in Bordentown, New Jersey. He was appointed midshipman on 16 January 1809 and served on Thomas Macdonough's flagship  in the Battle of Lake Champlain. He was killed in action while in the act of sighting his gun on 11 September 1814. Macdonough deplored Gamble's loss and commended his gallantry in action.

John M. Gamble was the brother of Peter Gamble and achieved the rank of Brevet Lieutenant Colonel in the United States Marine Corps.

No other ships in the United States Navy have borne this name.

Construction and commissioning
Gamble was launched 11 May 1918 by the Newport News Shipbuilding & Dry Dock Company, Newport News, Virginia, sponsored by Miss Evelyn H. Jackson, a relative of Secretary of the Navy Josephus Daniels. The ship was commissioned at Norfolk on 29 November 1918.

Service history
After shakedown training out of the Virginia Capes, Gamble sailed from New York City on 13 January 1919 to take part in maneuvers off Cuba; Key West, Florida; and the New England seaboard until June 1919. Following overhaul at Norfolk, she joined the Pacific Fleet at San Diego 7 August 1919 and operated along the Pacific coast until placed in reserve status in the Mare Island Navy Yard 1 December 1919. In October 1920, she came out of reserve and assisted the flotilla in torpedo practice; maneuvered with the Battle Force; and cruised along the California coast as a training ship for reservists. She decommissioned at San Diego on 17 June 1922.

Gamble recommissioned on 24 May 1930; was reclassified (DM-15) on 13 June, and converted into a light minelayer at the Mare Island Navy Yard. Arriving at Pearl Harbor from the West Coast, she became flagship of Mine Squadron 2 in July 1930 and later served as flagship of Mine Division 1, Mine Squadron 1. She patrolled Hawaiian waters instructing naval reservists in mine warfare and acted as plane guard and radio tracker for seaplanes, each year participating in fleet readiness and fleet problems until she returned to San Diego where she decommissioned on 22 December 1937. Recommissioning on 25 September 1939 as Europe was plunged into World War II, she joined Mine Division 5 in patrol and schoolship duties out of San Francisco. In April 1941, she proceeded to Pearl Harbor for war readiness patrol in Hawaiian waters as a unit of Mine Division 2.

World War II
On 7 December 1941, Gamble had returned from offshore patrol, when her peaceful routine was broken by the first of the Japanese carrier-based planes which attacked American ships in the harbor. Gambles gunners joined the fire of other warships and saw one enemy plane fall into the water on her port beam. When the U.S. Navy submarine  surfaced off Pearl Harbor later that day in attempt to enter the harbor and get medical attention for a severely injured crewman, Gamble mistook her for a Japanese submarine and opened gunfire on her as she surfaced, forcing her to submerge again immediately. By the time Thresher was able to reach Pearl Harbor on 8 December, her injured crewman had died.

After the attack on Pearl Harbor, Gamble took antisubmarine patrol station in the screen of the aircraft carrier , and later guarded the approaches to Pearl Harbor. In mid-February 1942, she headed south in the escort for a convoy to Pago Pago, American Samoa, then joined  in laying a protective minefield off Tutuila. At the end of March the two minelayers shifted to the Fiji Islands, to lay a minefield in Nadi waters from 7–14 April.

On 27 August 1942, Gamble joined a task unit headed to Guadalcanal. Although designated a destroyer-minelayer, the old vessel still carried antisubmarine gear. On the morning of 29 August, when her lookouts spotted a large enemy submarine, she immediately went into action. After several depth charge attacks, Gamble ran through large oil slicks, found deck planking, and observed a large air bubble break the surface. That afternoon she proceeded at full speed to Nura Island where she rescued four stranded aviators from the aircraft carrier . Continuing to aid in the struggle for Guadalcanal, she transported 158 Marines to the island on 31 August, patrolled off Lunga Roads, then on 5 September assisted in freeing  and escorted her to Espiritu Santo, New Hebrides Islands. Her patrol, escort, and transport duty continued as the drive for Guadalcanal pressed on to victory.

Making , each ship dropped a mine every 12 seconds, planting over 250 mines in 17 minutes across Blackett Strait, the western entrance to Kula Gulf and directly in the favorite route of the Japanese "Tokyo Express." The ships then sped north to join the protective screen of Rear Admiral Walden L. Ainsworth's cruiser-destroyer force before refueling at Tulagi. On the night of 7/8 May, four Japanese destroyers entered the mined waters. Aircraft, alerted by a coastwatcher, intercepted the rescue operation, sinking the two destroyers and sending Michishio limping back to port, badly damaged.

On 30 June 1943, during the invasion of New Georgia, Gamble laid a string of mines off the beachhead, before returning to Tulagi. In July welcome orders sent her back to the United States for overhaul. She headed west again on 20 September 1943. Her minelaying duties then brought her to Empress Augusta Bay from 1–2 November 1943 to support landing operations; Bougainville Strait, 7–8 November; Purvis Bay, Florida Island, 23–24 November, thence to the New Hebrides Islands for escort duty among the Solomons until she returned to San Francisco on 12 October 1944.

After overhaul and refresher training, Gamble departed San Diego on 7 January 1945, en route via Hawaii and the Marshalls to Iwo Jima where she arrived on 17 February, to lend fire support to the various sweeping units, and to explode floating mines. During her shelling a direct hit on an ammunition dump exploded the enemy magazine at the foot of Mount Suribachi.

Fate
On 18 February 1945, Gamble was hit just above the waterline by two  bombs. Both firerooms immediately flooded and she became dead in the water with two holes in her bottom as all hands fought raging fires, jettisoned topside weight and shored damaged bulkheads. Five men were killed, one missing in action, and eight wounded. She arrived at Saipan on 24 February and went alongside Hamul for repair.

Some hope remained for Gamble for a long time, but on 1 June 1945 she decommissioned, and, on 16 July, she was towed outside Apra Harbor, Guam and sunk.

Awards
Gamble received seven battle stars for service in World War II.

References

Citations

Bibliography
 Hinman, Charles R., and Douglas E. Campbell. The Submarine Has No Friends: Friendly Fire Incidents Involving U.S. Submarines During World War II. Syneca Research Group, Inc., 2019. .

External links
 NavSource Photos

 

Wickes-class destroyers
World War II mine warfare vessels of the United States
Ships present during the attack on Pearl Harbor
Destroyers sunk by aircraft
World War II shipwrecks in the Pacific Ocean
1918 ships
Ships built in Newport News, Virginia
Friendly fire incidents of World War II
Maritime incidents in December 1941
Maritime incidents in February 1945
Maritime incidents in July 1945
Ships sunk by Japanese aircraft